Oh Yeon-seo (born Oh Haet-nim []; June 22, 1987), is a South Korean actress, singer and model. She was a member of the girl group Luv under SidusHQ.

Film

Television series

Web series

Television shows

Music video appearances

Music drama

References

South Korean filmographies